Sarpinsky District (Sarpan rayon) is an administrative and municipal district (raion), one of the thirteen in the Republic of Kalmykia, Russia. It is located in the north of the republic. Its administrative center is the rural locality (a selo) of Sadovoye. As of the 2010 Census, the total population of the district was 13,796, with the population of Sadovoye accounting for 47.3% of that number.

Geography
The district is located in the northwest of Kalmykia, in the area of the Yergeni hills. It borders with  Maloderbetovsky District in the northeast, Ketchenerovsky District in the southeast, Zavetinskiy District of Rostov Oblast in the southwest, and with Kotelnikovsky and Oktyabrsky districts of Volgograd Oblast in the west.

History
The district was established in 1920.

Administrative and municipal status
Within the framework of administrative divisions, Sarpinsky District is one of the thirteen in the Republic of Kalmykia. The district is divided into nine rural administrations which comprise seventeen rural localities. As a municipal division, the district is incorporated as Sarpinsky Municipal District. Its nine rural administrations are incorporated as nine rural settlements within the municipal district. The selo of Sadovoye serves as the administrative center of both the administrative and municipal district.

References

Notes

Sources

Districts of Kalmykia
 
States and territories established in 1920